Swammy Awards are awarded annually by the American-based swimming news website SwimSwam. Categories include Swimmer of the Year, Junior Swimmer of the Year, Open Water Swimmer of the Year, Para-Swimmer of the Year and regional, NCAA, USA Swimming age group and coaching awards. 

The Swammy Awards were inaugurated in 2012.

Swimmers of the Year

Junior Swimmers of the Year

Open Water Swimmers of the Year

Para-Swimmers of the Year

References

Swimming awards
Awards established in 2012